Kodymirus is a problematic genus of Early Cambrian arthropod, known from the Czech Republic, which bears some resemblance to eurypterids and aglaspidids. Although it possessed great appendage-like raptorial arms, it was not homologous with those of megacheirans. It is part of a small and low-diversity Paseky Shale fauna group, which dwelt in brackish waters.

Description 
Its distinctive feature is pair of large, serrated raptorial appendages. These appendages appear convergent to those of megacheirans and radiodonts, but are not homologous as they postantennular, suggesting raptorial arms evolved multiple times in Cambrian arthropods.

Kodymirus is an enigmatic arthropod, and its precise taxonomic affinity remains uncertain. It was initially believed to be an early eurypterid and later a megacheiran, but today it is best considered to be a stem-group or ally of the aglaspidids. Its basipods closely resembles those of Emeraldella, and is suggested to be related to Beckwithia due to the presence of axial spines.

Paleoecology 
Kodymirus inhabited the Paseky Shale, within the modern day Czech Republic, which may be a shallow marine environment or brackish estuary. Trace fossils from the Shale have been interpreted as Kodymirus raking its claws along the sediment while swimming, disturbing benthic prey buried beneath the muck. This would make Kodymirus the earliest known arthropod predator in the intertidal zone.

References

Artiopoda
Fossils of the Czech Republic
Chelicerata incertae sedis
Cambrian genus extinctions